This is a list of  Time Team  episodes from series 15. The series was released on DVD (region 2) in 2013.

Episode

Series 15

Episode # refers to the air date order. The Time Team Specials are aired in between regular episodes, but are omitted from this list. Regular contributors on Time Team include: Tony Robinson (presenter); archaeologists Mick Aston, Phil Harding, Helen Geake, Neil Holbrook, Brigid Gallagher, Raksha Dave, Matt Williams, Faye Simpson, Ian Powlesland, Kerry Ely; historians Guy de la Bedoyere, Francis Pryor; Jackie McKinley (osteoarchaeologist); Victor Ambrus (illustrator); Stewart Ainsworth (landscape investigator); John Gater (geophysicist); Henry Chapman (surveyor); Mark Corney, Paul Blinkhorn (pottery experts); Raysan Al-Kubaisi (graphic designer).

References

External links
Time Team at Channel4.com
The Unofficial Time Team site Fan site

Time Team (Series 15)
2008 British television seasons